Acleris fuscopterana is a species of moth of the family Tortricidae. It is found in China (Xizang).

The wingspan is about 23.8 mm. The veins on the forewings are dark brown and the basal patch has a greyish-white outer margin. The costal patch and the tornus are dark brown. The hindwings are brown. Adults have been recorded on wing in May.

References

Moths described in 1993
fuscopterana
Moths of Asia